Gregory or Greg Moore may refer to:
Gregory L. Moore, American journalist and editor of the Denver Post
Gregory J. Moore, American political scientist. 
Greg Moore (racing driver) (1975–1999), racecar driver
Greg Moore (ice hockey) (born 1984), American ice hockey player
Greg Moore (guitarist), American rhythm guitarist with Earth, Wind & Fire
Greg Moore (physicist) (born 1961), string theorist at Rutgers University
Gregg Moore, member of the Eau Claire County Board of Supervisors and the current chairperson
Greg Moore (baseball) (born 1977), American college baseball coach